Ramil Hashimli (born 3 May 1978) is an Azerbaijani scientist. He is famous for his activities in the field of otorhinolaryngology in Azerbaijan. He is an docent and researcher. The "APDVoice patient database" he co-developed was designated by the European Union of Phoniatrics as a reference study program for phoniatric clinics. For the first time in Azerbaijan, a "voice thickening" operation was performed on a thin-voiced male patient. He is the General Secretary of the "Central and Western Asian Association of Ear, Nose, Throat and Head and Neck Surgery", a member of the board of directors of the Azerbaijan Otorhinolaryngology Society, a member of the European Union of Phoniatrics, the European Society of Laryngology, The Voice Foundation and the Middle Eurasian African Otolaryngology Society.

Career 
In 2007–2009, Ramil Hashimli worked as an otorhinolaryngologist at the clinic named after Nasireddin Tusi. In 2008, he started working as an assistant of the Department of Ear-Nose-Throat Diseases at the Azerbaijan State Medical Training Institute, and in 2019, he was elected to the position of associate professor of that department and currently works in this position. He also works as an ear-nose-throat surgeon, phoniatrist at the ENT Hospital and is the head of "VoiceDr Clinic".

Scientific career 
The main scientific and medical activity is dedicated to acute and chronic diseases of the larynx, etiopathogenesis of diseases encountered in voice professionals, modern examination and treatment methods.

He has acted as a speaker at more than 50 international and local scientific congresses with the results of his research. He is the author of more than 100 scientific publications.

A. with the grant support of Science Development Fund under the President of the Republic of Azerbaijan. He was the head of the project of building a phoniatry (sound examination) laboratory at ADHTI named after Aliyev. He is the co-author of the educational material "Fundamentals of Phoniatrics". The "APDVoice patient database" he co-developed was designated by the European Union of Phoniatrics as a reference study program for phoniatric clinics.

"Voice thickening" surgery was performed for the first time in Azerbaijan by the team of doctors led by Ramil Hashimli.

He is a member of the international editorial board of "Medeniyet" medical journal. Central and Western Asia QBB is the general secretary of the BBC Society. He is a member of Eurasian African Otolaryngology Society and European Society of Laryngology. He is the national coordinator of the International Sound Society for Azerbaijan.

References 

Living people
1978 births
Azerbaijan Medical University alumni
Azerbaijani scientists
Azerbaijani physicians